Michele Carringer (born February 4, 1962) is an American politician who currently serves as a member of the Tennessee House of Representatives from the 16th district. A Republican, Carringer's district includes the suburban areas directly north of Knoxville. Carringer was elected to the state house in 2020, succeeding longtime representative Bill Dunn.

Biography
Carringer is a graduate of Central High School in Knoxville. She served on the Knox County Commission between September 2016 and September 2020, representing the 2nd District.

Personal life
Carringer is married to Michael Carringer, and has two children and three grandchildren. She is a Southern Baptist.

References

1962 births
Politicians from Knoxville, Tennessee
Republican Party members of the Tennessee House of Representatives
21st-century American politicians
Women state legislators in Tennessee
21st-century American women politicians
Living people